Martindale is a civil parish in the Eden District, Cumbria, England.  It contains eleven listed buildings that are recorded in the National Heritage List for England.  Of these, one is listed at Grade II*, the middle of the three grades, and the others are at Grade II, the lowest grade.  The parish is in the Lake District National Park, and is sparsely populated, the only centres of habitation being the hamlets of Howtown and Sandwick; most of the parish consists of countryside, moorland and fells.  The listed buildings comprise houses and associated structures, farmhouses, farm buildings, two churches and a monument in a churchyard, and two bridges.


Key

Buildings

References

Citations

Sources

Lists of listed buildings in Cumbria